Taylor Wessing LLP is an international law firm with 28 offices internationally. The firm has over 300 partners and over 1000 lawyers worldwide. The company was formed as a result of a merger of the British law firm Taylor Joynson Garrett and the German law firm Wessing & Berenberg-Gossler, retaining the first name of each.

History

Taylor Joynson Garrett and its predecessors

The oldest predecessor of the Taylor law firm began in 1782 as a firm run by a sole practitioner, Thomas Smith. The first Taylor joined him as a partner in 1788. From 1805, the original Taylor then practised on his own until he died in 1822.

By then another partner, Jacob Mould had joined, and the firm continued under various names, usually incorporating the name "Taylor" until 1832 when the first Taylor's son (Taylor II) joined as a partner. The firm was then known as Mould Taylor & Co.

Mould departed shortly afterward and the firm became Parker, Taylor and Rooke. From 1848, Taylor II practised on his own until 1866, when his son, Taylor III joined him, the firm becoming known as R.S. Taylor & Son.  He was joined by the first Humbert in 1879, the firm becoming R.S. Taylor Son & Humbert.  This name was streamlined to Taylor & Humbert forty years later.

Taylor & Humbert merged with Parker Garrett in 1982, becoming Taylor Garrett. The firm then merged with Joynson-Hicks in 1989, calling itself Taylor Joynson Garrett.

Wessing & Berenberg-Gossler and its predecessors

In 1873, the oldest predecessor of the Wessing & Berenberg-Gossler law firm was founded in Hamburg by Hermann May and Alfons Mittelstrass. The firm was focused on corporate legal services catering to the Hanseatic merchants, the elite class that ruled the city-republic of Hamburg. This firm evolved into Berenberg-Gossler & Partner as its then-owner Günter von Berenberg-Gossler for the first time accepted multiple lawyers as partners in his firm in 1960. Berenberg-Gossler belonged to the Berenberg banking dynasty, owners of Berenberg Bank (formally Joh. Berenberg, Gossler & Co.) and widely regarded as one of Hamburg's two most prominent Hanseatic families. The Berenberg-Gossler & Partner firm became the most prominent corporate law firm of Hamburg.

Count Rüdiger von der Goltz had established a law practice in Stettin in 1926, and in 1954, he accepted the young lawyer Kurt Wessing as a partner.

The law firm of Zimmermann, Reimer, Hohenlohe Sommer had been established in 1975, in Munich, and later became Zimmermann, Hohenlohe, Sommer, Rojahn.

In 1989, Berenberg-Gossler & Partner merged with Graf von der Goltz Wessing & Partner and Zimmermann Hohenlohe Sommer Rojahn. In 1993, the company merged with the renowned Frankfurt law firm Kanzlei Lange & von Braunschweig, and became Wessing Berenberg-Gossler Zimmermann Lange (often known as Wessing & Berenberg-Gossler).

Taylor Wessing
In 2002, Taylor and Wessing & Berenberg-Gossler merged to become Taylor Wessing. In March 2012 RHT Law in Singapore formally joined Taylor Wessing (RHTLaw Taylor Wessing) and in May 2012 Austrian firm e|n|w|c merged, adding a further eight offices over six new jurisdictions. The firm has been using the name "Taylor" for over 230 years. In 2013, the firm was named Law Firm of the Year at The Lawyer Awards 2013.

In June 2014 two representative offices were opened in Palo Alto and New York City to provide on-the-ground support to US clients. An association with the Korean firm DR & AJU International Law Group was established in May 2014 extending Taylor Wessing's presence in Southeast Asia. In September 2015 two new offices were established in the Netherlands through a merger with leading Netherlands firm Deterink Advocaten en Notarissen. In 2016, the firm extended its presence in Hong Kong with the creation of a new local office and association with local firm HM Chan & Co. In 2018, Taylor Wessing expanded its presence in the UK with the opening of a new office in Liverpool.

Taylor Wessing Photographic Portrait Prize

Taylor Wessing sponsors London's National Portrait Gallery yearly Photographic Portrait Prize, having done so since 2008. Taylor Wessing's relationship with the Gallery began in 2005 with their sponsorship of The World's Most Photographed.

Controversies

In 2019, the firm introduced a grade-based remuneration in Germany. Research assistants who passed two honours examinations (Prädikatsexamen) received 1,100 euros per weekly working day. This corresponds to a converted hourly wage of around 32 euros for a working day of eight hours. Those who had not passed both state examinations with honours only received around 27 euros per hour. A research assistant or a trainee who had only taken the first exam (junior staff) could now earn 1,000 euros per week working day, the same amount as an employee who was already admitted to the bar, but had finished his exams with lower marks. The system caused a great stir and was abolished after one year.

References

Sources
 The Legal 500
 Chambers and Partners
 Chambers Student Guide

External links
 
 Taylor Wessing Photographic Portrait Prize at the National Portrait Gallery

Law firms established in 2002
2002 establishments in Germany
2002 establishments in the United Kingdom
Law firms of Germany
Law firms of the United Kingdom
Foreign law firms with offices in the Netherlands